An operating theater (also known as an operating room (OR), operating suite, or operation suite) is a facility within a hospital where surgical operations are carried out in an aseptic environment.

Historically, the term "operating theater" referred to a non-sterile, tiered theater or amphitheater in which students and other spectators could watch surgeons perform surgery. Contemporary operating rooms are usually devoid of a theater setting, making the term "operating theater" a misnomer in those cases.

Operating rooms
Operating rooms are spacious, in a cleanroom, and well-lit, typically with overhead surgical lights, and may have viewing screens and monitors. Operating rooms are generally windowless, though windows are becoming more prevalent in newly built theaters to provide clinical teams with natural light, and feature controlled temperature and humidity. Special air handlers filter the air and maintain a slightly elevated pressure. Electricity support has backup systems in case of a black-out. Rooms are supplied with wall suction, oxygen, and possibly other anesthetic gases. Key equipment consists of the operating table and the anesthesia cart. In addition, there are tables to set up instruments. There is storage space for common surgical supplies. There are containers for disposables. Outside the operating room, or sometimes integrated within, is a dedicated scrubbing area that is used by surgeons, anesthetists, ODPs (operating department practitioners), and nurses prior to surgery. An operating room will have a map to enable the terminal cleaner to realign the operating table and equipment to the desired layout during cleaning. Operating rooms are typically supported by an anaesthetic room, prep room, scrub and a dirty utility room.

Several operating rooms are part of the operating suite that forms a distinct section within a health-care facility. Besides the operating rooms and their wash rooms, it contains rooms for personnel to change, wash, and rest, preparation and recovery rooms, storage and cleaning facilities, offices, dedicated corridors, and possibly other supportive units. In larger facilities, the operating suite is climate- and air-controlled, and separated from other departments so that only authorized personnel have access.

Temperature and surgical site infections (SSI). Operating rooms are typically kept below 73.4 °F (23 °C) & room temperature is the most critical factor in influencing heat loss. Surgeons wear multiple layers (surgical gowns, lead aprons) and may perspire into an incision if not kept cool; excessive heat may also decrease concentration and increase the frequency of errors. Higher temperatures increased subjective physical demand and frustration of the surgical staff. One option is to heat the patient to prevent surgical site infections (SSI) and keep the surgical team cool. There is a 3 fold increase in infection for every 1.9 degree Celsius body temperature decrease because of weakened immune response at lower body temperatures. Radiation is the major cause of heat loss in patients, and convection (through air) is the second cause of heat loss. In the first hour, it is common for a healthy patient’s temperature to decrease 0.5-1.5 °C as anesthesia causes rapid decrease in core temperature. One study found that the most efficient method of maintaining normothermia included using warm wraps and a heating blanket (commercially known as a Bair Hugger) [6]. Additionally, pre-warming for thirty minutes may prevent hypothermia.

Operating room equipment

The operating table in the center of the room can be raised, lowered, and tilted in any direction.
The operating room lights are over the table to provide bright light, without shadows, during surgery.
The anesthesia machine is at the head of the operating table. This machine has tubes that connect to the patient to assist them in breathing during surgery, and built-in monitors that help control the mixture of gases in the breathing circuit.
The anesthesia cart is next to the anesthesia machine. It contains the medications, equipment, and other supplies that the anesthesiologist may need.
Sterile instruments to be used during surgery are arranged on a stainless steel table.
An electronic monitor (which records the heart rate and respiratory rate by adhesive patches that are placed on the patient's chest).
The pulse oximeter machine attaches to the patient's finger with an elastic band aid. It measures the amount of oxygen contained in the blood.

Automated blood pressure measuring machine that automatically inflates the blood pressure cuff on a patient's arm.
An electrocautery machine uses high frequency electrical signals to cauterize or seal off blood vessels and may also be used to cut through tissue with a minimal amount of bleeding.
If surgery requires, a heart-lung machine or other specialized equipment may be brought into the room.
Advances in technology now support hybrid operating rooms, which integrate diagnostic imaging systems such as MRI and cardiac catheterization into the operating room to assist surgeons in specialized neurological and cardiac procedures.

Surgeon and assistants' equipment
People in the operating room wear PPE (personal protective equipment) to help prevent bacteria from infecting the surgical incision. This PPE includes the following:

A protective cap covering their hair
Masks over their lower face, covering their mouths and noses with minimal gaps to prevent inhalation of plume or airborne microbes
Shades or glasses over their eyes, including specialized colored glasses for use with different lasers. a fiber-optic headlight may be attached for greater visibility
Sterile gloves; usually latex-free due to latex sensitivity which affects some health care workers and patients
Long gowns, with the bottom of the gown no closer than six inches to the ground.
Protective covers on their shoes
If x-rays are expected to be used, lead aprons/neck covers are used to prevent overexposure to radiation

The surgeon may also wear special glasses that help him/her to see more clearly. The circulating nurse and anesthesiologist will not wear a gown in the OR because they are not a part of the sterile team. They must keep a distance of 12-16 inches from any sterile object, person, or field.

History

Early operating theaters in an educational setting had raised tables or chairs at the center for performing operations surrounded by steep tiers of standing stalls for students and other spectators to observe the case in progress. The surgeons wore street clothes with an apron to protect them from blood stains, and they operated bare-handed with unsterilized instruments and supplies.

The University of Padua began teaching medicine in 1222. It played a leading role in the identification and treatment of diseases and ailments, specializing in autopsies and the inner workings of the body.
In 1884 German surgeon Gustav Neuber implemented a comprehensive set of restrictions to ensure sterilization and aseptic operating conditions through the use of gowns, caps, and shoe covers, all of which were cleansed in his newly invented autoclave. In 1885 he designed and built a private hospital in the woods where the walls, floors and hands, arms and faces of staff were washed with mercuric chloride, instruments were made with flat surfaces and the shelving was easy-to-clean glass. Neuber also introduced separate operating theaters for infected and uninfected patients and the use of heated and filtered air in the theater to eliminate germs. In 1890 surgical gloves were introduced to the practice of medicine by William Halsted. Aseptic surgery was pioneered in the United States by Charles McBurney.

Surviving operating theaters

The oldest surviving operating theater is thought to be the 1804 operating theater of the Pennsylvania Hospital in Philadelphia.  The 1821 Ether Dome of the Massachusetts General Hospital is still in use as a lecture hall. Another surviving operating theater is the Old Operating Theatre in London. Built in 1822, it is now a museum of surgical history. The  Anatomical Theater at the University of Padua, in Italy, inside Palazzo Bo was constructed and used as a lecture hall for medical students who observed the dissection of corpses, not surgical operations. It was commissioned by the anatomist Girolamo Fabrizio d'Acquapendente in 1595.

See also
 Anatomical theater
 Hybrid operating room

References

External links 

 Video of a newly-built orthopaedic operating theater in the United Kingdom

Surgery
Hospitals